CFGW-FM is a Canadian radio station that broadcasts a hot adult contemporary format, at 94.1 FM in Yorkton, Saskatchewan. The station is owned by Harvard Media, and branded as Fox FM. It has a sister station, CJGX. Both studios are located at 120 Smith Street East.

CFGW was licensed in 2000 and began broadcasting in 2001.

Rebroadcasters
CFGW-FM-1 95.3 - Dauphin-Swan River, Manitoba
CFGW-FM-2 102.9 - Moosomin, Wapella and Whitewood

References

External links
 Fox FM
 

Fgw
Fgw
Fgw
Radio stations established in 2000
2000 establishments in Saskatchewan